Neil Darren Arndale (born 26 April 1984) is a former professional footballer who plays as a defender. He played in The Football League for Bristol Rovers and has also played youth football internationally for England. He is currently with Larkhall Athletic.

Arndale came through the youth ranks at Bristol Rovers and was promoted to the senior squad in 2002. During this time he was selected to play for England under-16s and England under-18s. In all he played five League games and one game in the Football League Trophy for The Pirates, and was also sent out on loan to Clevedon Town on what the club referred to as 'work experience' terms.

He was released by Bristol Rovers in 2004 and dropped down into non-League football. He spent two years with Cirencester Town, where he was club captain, before joining Mangotsfield United in 2006. Arndale was linked heavily with a move to Gloucester City during his spell with Mangotsfield however rejected the decision to move up the pyramid.

In June 2011, Arndale returned to former club, Cirencester Town. However, in October 2011, he left the club, and returned to Mangotsfield United.

He joined Mangotsfield United  in 2011 but in January 2012 left the club, as he wished to take a break from football due to work commitments. A few months later however in May 2012, he returned to Mangotsfield for a third spell, moving to Larkhall Athletic  in 2015.

References

External links

1984 births
Living people
English footballers
Association football defenders
English Football League players
Bristol Rovers F.C. players
Clevedon Town F.C. players
Cirencester Town F.C. players
Mangotsfield United F.C. players
Southern Football League players
Footballers from Bristol